Crysencio Jilbert Sylverio Cirro Summerville (born 30 October 2001) is a Dutch professional footballer who plays as a forward for  club Leeds United.

Club career

Feyenoord 
Born in Rotterdam to Surinamese parents, Summerville played youth football at RVVV Noorderkwartier before joining the Feyenoord academy in 2008. In March 2018, he signed his first professional contract with Feyenoord; a contract lasting until the summer of 2021.

On 12 December 2018, he joined FC Dordrecht on loan until the end of the 2018–19 season. He made his Eerste Divisie debut for Dordrecht on 13 January 2019 in a game against Den Bosch, as a 70th-minute substitute for Oussama Zamouri. On 29 January 2019, he made his starting eleven debut for the club, scoring his first goal as a professional footballer in the sixth minute.

In August 2019, he joined fellow Eredivisie side ADO Den Haag on loan. He made his debut for the club on 31 August 2019 in a 1–0 win against VVV Venlo in a 1–0 victory. On 26 October 2019, he scored his first Eredivisie goal for ADO Den Haag on 26 October 2019 in a 2–0 win against Vitesse Arnhem, becoming the youngest goalscorer for the club in the Eredivisie. He impressed for the club during his spell, scoring two goals and gained three assists for the side.

He returned to Feyenoord at the end of his loan spell ahead of the 2020–21 Eredivisie season, with Voetbal International reporting on 17 August 2020 that Summerville had turned down a new extended contract offer at Feyenoord.

Leeds United 
On 16 September 2020, Summerville joined Leeds United for an undisclosed fee, signing a three-year contract. 

He made his debut on 17 September 2021 against Newcastle United, in the Premier League, coming on for Raphinha in the 67th minute. 

On 23 October 2022, he scored his first Premier League goal in a 3–2 defeat against Fulham. Six days later he scored the winning goal in the 89th minute in a 2–1 victory over Liverpool, making it his club's first win at Anfield since April 2001, simultaneously ending Liverpool's 29-game unbeaten streak at home in the Premier League. On 5 November 2022, he scored another late winning goal to give Leeds a come-from-behind 4–3 win at home against Bournemouth. His goal in Leeds’ 4–3 away loss  at Tottenham Hotspur on 12 November brought Summerville's league tally to four goals in four consecutive games, as the Premier League went on hiatus for the World Cup.

On 4 January 2023, he provided a one-two assist for Wilfried Gnonto’s debut league goal in a 2–2 home draw against West Ham United.

International career 
Born in the Netherlands, Summerville is of Surinamese descent. He won the 2018 UEFA European Under-17 Championship with the Netherlands national under-17 football team, scoring a goal in the group game against Germany and appearing as a substitute in the final against Italy.

Career statistics

Honours 
Netherlands U17
 UEFA European Under-17 Championship: 2018

Notes

References

External links 
 
 
 

2001 births
Living people
Dutch footballers
Netherlands youth international footballers
Dutch sportspeople of Surinamese descent
Association football forwards
Feyenoord players
FC Dordrecht players
ADO Den Haag players
Eredivisie players
Eerste Divisie players
Footballers from Rotterdam
Leeds United F.C. players
Dutch expatriate footballers
Dutch expatriate sportspeople in England
Expatriate footballers in England
Premier League players